Tantsi z zirkamy (Танці з зірками), the Ukrainian version of Dancing with the Stars returned for its fifth season in Autumn 2017, following a 10-year hiatus. Unlike season 4, season 5 aired on the show's original network, 1+1.

Following the announcement of the show's comeback, a viral challenge was started by the show's producers to progressively reveal this season's cast. Each nominated celebrity had to post a video to their social media accounts under the hashtag #танціззіркамиchallenge (Dancing with the Stars challenge), either accepting or declining the invitation to participate. The nominated celebrity also had to pass on the challenge by nominating another person.

On July 5, Yuriy Horbunov became the first celebrity to confirm his participation as the host of the show. He nominated the runner-up couple of seasons 1 and 3, Natalia Mohylevska and Vladyslav Yama, who both confirmed their participation in the upcoming season. On August 12, it was announced that Yama would join the judging panel, while Mohylevska would participate in the series as a celebrity contestant. This marked the third time Mohylevska competed on the show, having previously participated in the first season in 2006, followed by an all-stars season in 2007, with a second place finish on both occasions.

The first celebrity to confirm their participation as a contestant was travel show host Dmytro Komarov. Kateryna Kukhar, National Opera of Ukraine ballerina, accepted a position on the judging panel. Following Komarov, the invitation to participate was accepted by Eurovision Song Contest 2017 host Oleksandr Skichko, lead singer of Vremya i Steklo Nadya Dorofeeva, Crimean Tatar actor and movie director Ahtem Seytablayev, TV psychologist Natalia Kholodenko, singer and socialite Kamaliya, singer and TV host Olya Polyakova as well as actor and comedian Yuriy Tkach. On July 16, TV host and singer Volodymyr Dantes became the first celebrity to decline the invitation to compete, while on July 28 singer and dancer Monatik confirmed his participation as a judge. On August 19, singer and The Voice of Ukraine judge Serhiy Babkin became the final celebrity to announce their participation.

During the first live show on August 27, it was announced that each week, Yuriy Horbunov would be joined by a new guest host. Guest hosts for each live show can be found in the table below.

On October 29, actor and director Ahtem Seytablayev and his partner Olena Shoptenko finished in third place, singer Nadya Dorofeeva and her partner Yevhen Kot finished second, while singer Natalia Mohylevska and her partner Ihor Kuzmenko were crowned champions. This marks the first win for Mohylevska, who has finished in second place twice before – in season 1 and season 3. Mohylevska has also made history for being the only celebrity to ever participate in the show three times. In terms of viewer votes, Mohylevska and Kuzmenko had an over 20% lead over runners-up Dorofeeva & Kot.

Couples

Scores

Red numbers indicate the lowest score for each week.
Green numbers indicate the highest score for each week.
 indicates the couple eliminated that week.
 indicates the returning couple that finished in the bottom two.
 indicates the couple that withdrew.
 indicates the couple that was saved from elimination by another couple's withdrawal.
 indicates the winning couple.
 indicates the runner-up couple.
 indicates the couple in third place.

Average score chart 
This table only counts for dances scored on a 30-points scale.

Highest and lowest scoring performances
The best and worst performances in each dance according to the judges' 30-point scale are as follows:

Couples' highest and lowest scoring dances
Scores are based upon a potential 30-point maximum.

Weekly scores and songs
Unless indicated otherwise, individual judges scores in the charts below (given in parentheses) are listed in this order from left to right: Monatik, Kateryna Kukhar, Vladyslav Yama.
The flower sign indicates the couple received a flower from Kateryna Kukhar.

Week 1: Premiere
Running order

Week 2
Running order

Judges' votes to save

Monatik: Oleksandr & Anna
Kukhar: Natalia Kh. & Vitaliy
Yama: Natalia Kh. & Vitaliy

Week 3: Evening of Love
 Running order

Week 4: Made in Ukraine
 Running order

Judges' votes to save

Monatik: Serhiy & Shizhana
Kukhar: Olya & Stepan
Yama: Serhiy & Shizhana

Week 5: Movie Night
 Running order

Week 6: Cultural Dances
 Running order

Week 7: Retro Circus
 Running order

Judges' votes to save

Monatik: Serhiy & Shizhana
Kukhar: Yuriy & Ilona
Yama: Serhiy & Shizhana

Dance chart 
The celebrities and professional partners danced one of these routines for each corresponding week:
 Week 1 (Season Premiere): Samba, Waltz, Rumba, Paso Doble, Argentine Tango, Jive, Broadway, Contemporary, Pop-jazz or Hip-hop
 Week 2: One unlearned dance (introducing Tango, Jazz, Freestyle, Salsa and Cha-cha-cha)
 Week 3 (Evening of Love): One unlearned dance (introducing Quickstep, Foxtrot and Modern)
 Week 4 (Made in Ukraine): One unlearned dance
 Week 5 (Cinema Evening): One unlearned dance (introducing Viennese Waltz and Disco)
 Week 6 (Switch-up Challenge): One unlearned dance (introducing Jazz-funk)
 Week 7 (Circus Night): One unlearned dance (introducing Lyrical Jazz)
 Week 8 (Time Machine): Two unlearned dances (introducing Afro-jazz and Rock'n'Roll)
 Week 9 (Semifinals): One unlearned or repeated dance and a trio dance (introducing Swing, Street dance and Fusion)
 Week 10 (Grand Final): Repeated week 1 dance, viewers' choice dance and couple's choice dance

 Highest scoring dance
 Lowest scoring dance

Guest hosts

Guest performances

References

Notes

External links
 

Ukraine
2017 Ukrainian television seasons